Polyphemus pediculus is a species of onychopod in the family Polyphemidae. It is found throughout the Northern Hemisphere in freshwater systems.

References

External links

 

Cladocera
Articles created by Qbugbot
Crustaceans described in 1761
Taxa named by Carl Linnaeus